At least five ships of the British Royal Navy have been named HMS Spiteful; 

 was a vessel purchased in the West Indies that served as a gunboat at the capture of Martinique, St Lucia, and Guadeloupe in 1794; her fate is unknown. Her crew qualified for the Naval General Service Medal with clasp "17 Mar. Boat Service 1794"
  – a 14-gun brig, launched in 1797, disposed of in 1823.
  – a 6-gun steam sloop, launched on 24 March 1842, disposed of in 1883.
  – a  torpedo boat destroyer built in 1899, and scrapped in 1920.
  – an S-class submarine of the Second World War.

Citations

Royal Navy ship names